Turtiainen is a Finnish surname. Notable people with the surname include:

Ano Turtiainen, Finnish politician
Arvo Turtiainen (1904–1980), Finnish writer
Jaakko Turtiainen (born 1991), Finnish professional ice hockey forward
Toivo Turtiainen (1883–1920), Finnish politician

Finnish-language surnames